Museo ABC is a museum in Madrid, Spain, dedicated to drawing and illustration.

The museum is housed in a converted brewery. The privately funded museum was established in 2010. Its collection includes over 200,000 items from the Spanish daily newspaper ABC, which began collecting examples of drawing and graphic illustration in 1891.

References

2010 establishments in Spain
Art museums established in 2010
Art museums and galleries in Madrid
Drawing
Illustration